Arsenal Stadium was a football stadium in Highbury, London, which was the home of Arsenal Football Club between 6 September 1913 and 7 May 2006. It was popularly known as "Highbury" due to its location and was given the affectionate nickname of the "Home of Football".

It was originally built in 1913 on the site of a local college's recreation ground and was significantly redeveloped twice. The first reconstruction came in the 1930s from which the Art Deco East and West Stands date. There was a second development; the first phase was completed in 1989 which added executive boxes to the Clock End, and afterwards in 1993 a new North Bank Stand was constructed, both following the recommendations of the Taylor Report which replaced the terraces to make the stadium an all-seater with four stands. However, further attempts to expand the stadium were blocked by the community, and the resulting reduction in capacity and matchday revenue eventually led to Arsenal opting to build a new stadium, to become known as the Emirates Stadium in nearby Islington. After the club moved to their new stadium upon the conclusion of the 2005–2006 season, Highbury was redeveloped as a residential development known as Highbury Square, with the Clock End and North Bank stands being demolished; parts of the East and West Stands remained and were incorporated into the new development due to their listed status.

The stadium also hosted international matches – both for England and in the 1948 Summer Olympics – and FA Cup semi-finals, as well as boxing, baseball and cricket matches. Its presence also led to the local London Underground station being renamed to Arsenal in 1932, making it the only station on the Underground network to be named after a football club.

In addition to its architecture, the stadium was known for its small but immaculate pitch and for the clock which had been positioned in the southern side of the ground since its introduction in 1930.

History

The original stadium was built in 1913, when Woolwich Arsenal moved from the Manor Ground in Plumstead, South East London to Highbury, leasing the recreation fields of St John's College of Divinity for £20,000. The lease negotiation also agreed that no matches were to be played on "holy days" and that no "intoxicating liquor" would be sold at the stadium; however, these stipulations were dropped within a year. The stadium was hurriedly built over the summer of that year, and was designed by Archibald Leitch, architect of many other football grounds of that era. It featured a single stand on the eastern side and the other three sides had banked terracing. The new stadium cost £125,000. It opened whilst not fully complete, with Arsenal's first match of the 1913–14 season, a 2–1 Second Division win against Leicester Fosse on 6 September 1913. Leicester's Tommy Benfield scored the first goal at the new ground while George Jobey was the first Arsenal player to do so. Highbury hosted its first England match in 1920.

The Australian rugby league team suffered the first loss of their 1921–22 Kangaroo tour of Great Britain at Highbury to an English side 4 points to 5 before approximately 12,000 spectators.

Arsenal bought the stadium site outright in 1925, for £64,000.

No significant portion of Leitch's original stadium remains today following a series of bold redevelopments during the 1930s. The idea was to create a ground for London that could capture the grandeur of Villa Park, home of Birmingham club Aston Villa. The Highbury project was ambitious in its scale and reach, the first stand completed being the West Stand, designed by Claude Waterlow Ferrier and William Binnie in the Art Deco style which opened in 1932. On 5 November the same year the local Tube station was renamed from Gillespie Road to Arsenal. Leitch's main stand was demolished to make way for a new East Stand, matching the West, in 1936. The West Stand cost £45,000 while the East Stand went far over budget and ended up costing £130,000, mainly thanks to the expense of the facade. The North Bank terrace was given a roof and the southern terrace had a clock fitted to its front, giving it the name the Clock End.

During the 1948 Summer Olympics, the stadium hosted the football preliminaries. For the next 50 years, the stadium changed little, although during the Second World War the North Bank terrace was bombed and had to be rebuilt; the roof was not restored until 1956. Floodlights were fitted in 1951, with the first floodlit match being a friendly against Hapoel Tel Aviv on 19 September of that year. The floodlights that adorn Dalymount Park, once stood at the Arsenal stadium. They were shipped to Dublin in 1962. The inaugural floodlit match saw Arsenal beat Bohemians 3–8. Undersoil heating was added in 1964. Unlike at many other grounds, Arsenal refused to install perimeter fencing, even at the height of hooliganism in the 1980s, which made it ineligible for use as an FA Cup semi-final venue.

Before the Taylor report and the era of all-seater stadiums in Britain, both the North Bank and Clock End consisted of terracing, and the stadium often saw crowds of up to 60,000 or more; its largest attendance was 73,295 on 9 March 1935 when Arsenal played Sunderland in the First Division; the game finished 0–0. When the ground was initially constructed, it was to "accommodate 90,000 spectators".

The Clock End was redeveloped in 1988–89 with the addition of a roof and 48 executive boxes, while seating was fitted into the remaining standing area in 1993.

In January 1990, the Taylor report on the Hillsborough disaster was published, which recommended that football stadia become all-seater. The North Bank, which had become home of Arsenal's most passionate supporters, was demolished at the end of the 1991–92 season. During redevelopment, a giant mural of fans was placed behind the goal at that end, to give the illusion that the players were kicking towards a crowd rather than a construction site. The mural initially attracted criticism for its absence of black fans, which was quickly rectified. The lengthy process of rebuilding the North Bank meant that Highbury was three-sided for the entire 1992–93 season, which was also the first season of the new FA Premier League. Although a lack of goals meant that Arsenal only finished 10th in the new league, they won both of the domestic cup competitions that season. Populous (then LOBB Partnership) designed all-seater two-tier North Bank Stand, the last area of Highbury to be refurbished, which was opened in August 1993 at a cost of £20 million amid strong opposition from local residents. The new North Bank Stand contained a museum and a concourse with video arcades, bars, confectionery counters, souvenir shops and fast-food stands. While the all-seater North Bank was "never the same as the old-fashioned Archibald Leitch stand" that it replaced, it was "much more like the future of Arsenal than the past" with its added amenities and "Gone were the days of pushing a petrified child through a packed crowd and placing them on a barrier from which they could only see a small section of the pitch". The old stand had received a fitting send off with a 5–1 defeat of Southampton, though the new stand had a less auspicious start, the first game being a surprise 0–3 defeat to Coventry City with all three goals coming from striker Micky Quinn. The first victory came 10 days later against Leeds United.

Structure

At the time of its closure, the stadium consisted of four separate all-seater stands; the pitch was aligned north–south, with the North Bank Stand (formerly the Laundry End) and South Stand (popularly known as the Clock End) at the ends of the field. The East and West Stands ran alongside the pitch and are two of the few examples of British football stands designed in the Art Deco style. The East Stand incorporated the club's offices and was well known for its marble halls (though the floors were actually terrazzo) which are often cited in media depictions of the stadium, and the facade that faces onto Avenell Road. The East Stand is considered architecturally significant enough to have been designated a Grade II listed building.

The stadium's main entrances were on Gillespie Road, Avenell Road and Highbury Hill. When it closed, Highbury had a capacity of 38,419 (approximately 12,500 in the North Bank, 11,000 in the West Stand, 9,000 in the East Stand and 6,000 in the Clock End), all seated, and had Jumbotron screens in the south-east and north-west corners.

Arsenal Stadium was well known for its very small immaculately-kept pitch, which measured only 109×73 yards (100×67 metres). Arsenal's groundsmen, Steve Braddock and his successor Paul Burgess, won the FA Premier League's Groundsman of the Year award several times for their work on the stadium.

Closure and redevelopment

The post-Taylor capacity of Highbury was limited to 38,419, while Arsenal's success during the 1990s and 2000s meant that virtually every home match was filled to near capacity. Restrictions, such as the East Stand's status as a listed building and the fact the stadium was surrounded on all sides by a residential area, made any future expansion of Highbury difficult and expensive, although the club's directors would have liked to have kept Arsenal at a modernised and expanded Highbury. In October 1998, just after Arsenal started playing Champions League games at Wembley, the club made an unsuccessful bid to buy the stadium and make it their permanent home to share with the England national football team.

In November 1999, Arsenal decided to leave Highbury and construct a new 60,000-seat stadium in nearby Ashburton Grove. It was confirmed in October 2004 that the new stadium would be called the Emirates Stadium as part of a sponsorship deal with Emirates Airlines. The stadium opened in July 2006; Arsenal's offices were moved to a new building, Highbury House, which was named in commemoration of the former stadium.

For their final season at Highbury (2005–06) Arsenal ran a series of promotions honouring the stadium's legacy. A commemorative logo was designed featuring the club's traditional Art Deco crest from the 1930s, and the club's history at Highbury was celebrated through a series of themed matchdays. On the field, Arsenal temporarily set aside their traditional red shirts with white sleeves for the season and adopted a solid redcurrant shirt, the colour they wore during their first season at Highbury in 1913–14.

Arsenal's final game at the stadium was their FA Premier League match on 7 May 2006 against Wigan Athletic, the last game of the season. The team needed to better the result of neighbours Tottenham Hotspur to again secure qualification for the Champions League. Having been 2–1 behind, a hat trick by captain and all-time leading goal scorer Thierry Henry secured qualification, with Henry kneeling down to kiss the turf on scoring what proved to be the final goal seen at the stadium. The last goal scored in a regulation game at the stadium came in a Football Aid charity match when lifelong fan Alan Alger scored a penalty in the final minute of a fixture played on Thursday 8 June 2006 (exactly one month and one day after Henry's goal). After the stadium's closure, Arsenal held an auction to sell off many of the stadium's parts, including pieces of the pitch, the goalposts and former manager George Graham's desk. Sale of the stadium's seats had to be cancelled after it was found they contained trace amounts of the toxic metal cadmium.

, Arsenal Stadium was redeveloped and converted into flats in a project known as "Highbury Square", a scheme that had 711 properties built on the site. The North Bank and Clock End stands were demolished. The exteriors of the listed Art Deco East Stand and the matching West Stand were preserved and incorporated into the new developments, while the rest of the stands' structures were removed, and the pitch became a communal garden. In October 2005 the proposed flats went on sale; as of May 2006 all properties in the North, East and West Stands had been taken.

Arsenal's clock was moved from Highbury to the outer side of the new stadium, with a new larger version of the feature added inside the ground in August 2010. At the same time as the unveiling of the new clock, the south stands at the venue were also renamed Clock End in line with the same name previously used at Highbury.

Other roles

As well as being home to Arsenal, it also hosted games as home stadium for England matches; 12 internationals were played at Highbury from 1920 to 1961, most of them being friendlies. These included both England's first full home international against opposition outside of Great Britain and Ireland (Belgium in 1923), and the "Battle of Highbury", England's 3–2 win over World Champions Italy in 1934, where a record seven Arsenal players started the match, the most players from a single club to play in an England fixture. Highbury was also used as a football venue for two matches in the 1948 London Olympics – a first-round match and a quarter-final. It was also provisionally named as one of London's two host stadiums for the 1966 FIFA World Cup (along with Wembley), but was eventually dropped with White City Stadium taking the role instead. By the time of Euro 96, the pitch had been ruled too small for international football and the stadium would have been ineligible.

Highbury was the venue for twelve FA Cup semi-finals as a neutral ground, the first in 1929 and the last in 1997, although between 1984 and 1992 it was off the FA's list of approved venues, after Arsenal's refusal to install perimeter fencing following a pitch invasion by Everton fans during their semi-final against Southampton. It also hosted the London XI's home leg against Lausanne Sports in the 1955–58 Inter-Cities Fairs Cup semi-finals; London won 2–0 on the night and 3–2 on aggregate.

Arsenal did not always play their home matches at Highbury in the 93 years they were based there. During the Second World War the stadium was used as an ARP station and was bombed; Arsenal played their matches at White Hart Lane, home of North London rivals Tottenham Hotspur, until Highbury re-opened in 1946. More recently, Arsenal's home UEFA Champions League matches in the 1998–99 and 1999–00 seasons were played at Wembley Stadium, as Highbury's already limited capacity had to be reduced to accommodate advertising hoardings. Arsenal's record at Wembley (P6 W2 D1 L3) was relatively poor, and after two seasons the club switched back to playing at Highbury, not least because since Wembley closed for rebuilding in October 2000, it would not have been able to host their 2000–01 campaign.

Highbury has also hosted several cricket games and also baseball matches involving American servicemen between 1916 and 1919. It was the venue for the 1966 World Heavyweight boxing title bout between Henry Cooper and Muhammad Ali, which Ali won. It has featured on the silver screen as well, having been the backdrop for at least two movies: The Arsenal Stadium Mystery, and Fever Pitch.

Highbury also played host to an international rugby league match on 10 October 1921 as part of the Australian rugby league team's 1921–22 Kangaroo tour of Great Britain. The match saw England defeat Australia 5–4 in front of 12,000 fans.

Record scorelines
Arsenal's biggest win at Highbury came on 9 January 1932, with an 11–1 victory over Darwen in the FA Cup. Their biggest defeats were 0–5 losses to Huddersfield Town in the First Division on 14 February 1925 and against Chelsea in the League Cup on 11 November 1998.

Final record of results

Arsenal
Arsenal's complete competitive record at Highbury is as follows:

England
England's record at Highbury is as follows:

FA Cup semi-finals
FA Cup semi-finals held at Highbury are listed below. Arsenal never played a semi-final at their own stadium. Teams in bold went on to win the competition that year

Notes

References

Further reading

External links

 Highbury Square Official website of the redevelopment project

Venues of the 1948 Summer Olympics
Arsenal F.C. home grounds
Sport in the London Borough of Islington
Sports venues in London
Football venues in London
Defunct football venues in London
Demolished sports venues in the United Kingdom
Art Deco architecture in London
Grade II listed buildings in the London Borough of Islington
Sports venues completed in 1932
Sports venues completed in 1936
Sports venues completed in 1993
Premier League venues
Demolished buildings and structures in London
Former buildings and structures in the London Borough of Islington
Olympic football venues
Sports venues completed in 1913
1913 establishments in England
Sports venues demolished in 2006
Defunct football venues in England
Defunct rugby league venues in England